The District Council of Elliston is a local government area covering around 6500 km2 on the Western Eyre Peninsula in South Australia. Established in 1888, the district has a diverse economy, with agriculture, commercial fishing and tourism making up the majority of the local economy.

History
The council was established by the District Councils Act 1887 on 5 January 1888. The bounds were defined in the act as "Comprising the whole of the County of Musgrave, and portion of the County of Robinson south of a true east line from the most northern point of Venus Bay to the east boundary of the said county." This meant that the lands defined as the Hundred of Downer, Hundred of Wallis, most of the Hundred of Wright and an unincorporated area approximately 100 square miles between the three (proposed to be Hundred of McBeath but never gazetted) outside Musgrave county were included in the north west of the council area.

Localities
The district encompasses the main towns of Elliston, Lock, Port Kenny and Venus Bay, as well as a number of smaller towns and localities, including Bramfield, Colton, Coolillie, Kappawanta, Mount Joy, Mount Wedge, Murdinga, Palkagee, Polda, Sheringa, Talia, Tooligie and Ulyerra, and part of Hambidge and Mount Damper.

Economy
The district's economy relies on a combination of agriculture and seafood harvesting. Cereal crops and sheep are the main focuses of farming, with abalone and crayfish being important to professional fishermen. 

The district has two health facilities; A hospital at Elliston and a medical centre located in Lock.  Three schools exist in the district, as well as a community library in Lock. As with most districts on the Eyre Peninsula, there are a variety of sporting clubs and a number of jetties for recreational fishermen.

Council

Meetings
The Meetings of Council are held on the third Tuesday of each month. Meetings commence at 9.30 am and include a ten-minute question time which is open to the public.

External links
District Council of Elliston

References

Local government areas of South Australia
Eyre Peninsula
1888 establishments in Australia